Pelagornis sandersi is an extinct species of pseudotooth bird, whose fossil remains date from 25 million years ago, during the Chattian age of the Oligocene. The sole specimen of P. sandersi has a wingspan estimated between aaproximately , giving it the largest wingspan of any flying bird yet discovered, twice that of the wandering albatross, which has the largest wingspan of any extant bird (up to ).

In this regard, it supplants the previous record holder, the also extinct Argentavis magnificens.

Dan Ksepka of the National Evolutionary Synthesis Center in Durham, North Carolina, who identified that the discovered fossils belonged to a new species, thinks it was able to fly in part because of its relatively small body and long wings, and because it, like the albatross, spent much of its time over the ocean. Ksepka is currently focused on solving how P. sandersi evolved and what caused the species to go extinct.

Discovery
The only known fossil of P. sandersi was first uncovered in 1983 at Charleston International Airport, South Carolina, discovered by James Malcom, while working construction building a new terminal there. At the time the bird lived, 25 million years ago, global temperatures were higher, and the area where it was discovered was an ocean. After excavation, the fossil of P. sandersi was catalogued and put in storage at the Charleston Museum, where it remained until it was rediscovered by paleontologist Dan Ksepka in 2010. The bird is named after Albert Sanders, the former curator of natural history at the Charleston Museum, who led the excavation of P. sandersi. It currently sits at the Charleston Museum, where it was identified as a new species by Ksepka in 2014. 
"Though no feathers survived, Ksepka extrapolated the mass, wingspan, and wing shape from the fossilised bones and fed them into a computer to estimate how the bird might fly. A conservative estimate put the wingspan of P. sandersi at around 6.4 metres (21 feet)."

Physiology

P. sandersi had short, stumpy legs, and was probably able to fly only by hopping off cliff edges. Originally, there were controversies over whether or not P. sandersi would be able to fly. Previously, the assumed maximum wingspan of a flying animal was 17 ft (5.2 m), because it was hypothesized that above 17 ft, the power required to keep the bird in flight would surpass the power capacity of the bird's muscles. However, this calculation is based on the assumption that the bird in question stays aloft by repeatedly flapping its wings, whereas P. sandersi more likely glided on ocean air currents close to the water, which is less power-intensive than reaching high altitudes. P. sandersi's long wingspan and gliding power would have enabled it to travel long distances without landing while hunting. Like all members of the Pelagornithidae, P. sandersi had tooth-like or knob-like extensions of the bill's margin, called "pseudo-teeth," which would have enabled the living animal to better grip and grasp slippery prey. According to Ksepka, P. sandersis teeth "don’t have enamel, they don’t grow in sockets, and they aren’t lost and replaced throughout the creature’s life span." Due to P. sandersi's size, the bird likely molted all of its flight feathers at once, similarly to a Grebe, since larger feathers take longer to regrow. P. sandersi is theorized to have glided and traveled similarly to a modern albatross, however, according to Dan Ksepka, its closest modern relatives are chickens and ducks.

References

Birds described in 2014
Extinct birds of North America
Pelagornithidae
Oligocene birds
Fossil taxa described in 2014
Paleontology in South Carolina